John Braxton Hicks  (23 February 1823 – 28 August 1897) was a 19th-century English doctor who specialised in obstetrics.

He was born to Edward Hicks in Rye, Sussex. He was educated privately and in 1841 entered Guy's Hospital Medical School. He obtained his MB at the University of London in 1845 and an MD in 1851. He was elected a Fellow of the Royal College of Physicians in 1866.

In 1856 he was appointed assistant obstetric physician at Guy's Hospital and full physician in 1868. In 1888 he became obstetric physician at St Mary's Hospital, London. Hicks was the first physician to describe the bipolar and other methods of the version of a fetus. In 1872, he described the uterine contractions not resulting in childbirth now known as Braxton Hicks contractions.

In 1862 he was elected a Fellow of the Royal Society by virtue of his interest in Natural History, about which he wrote numerous papers. He gave the Hunterian Oration to the Hunterian Society in 1868 and was elected their president for 1879.

Braxton Hicks is buried at St Thomas Church, Lymington, Hampshire. For a while, an obstetric ward at St Thomas' Hospital was named after him; Braxton Hicks ward is now closed.

He was the father of coroner Athelstan Braxton Hicks (b 1854).

References

External links

ADC online article on John Braxton Hicks

1823 births
1897 deaths
People from Rye, East Sussex
19th-century English medical doctors
Fellows of the Royal College of Physicians
Fellows of the Royal Society
Fellows of the Linnean Society of London
Alumni of the University of London
Physicians of Guy's Hospital